Cooper Winston Helfet (born June 2, 1989) is a former American football tight end. He was signed by the Seattle Seahawks as an undrafted free agent in 2012. He played college football at Duke.

Early years
Helfet attended Mark Day School for elementary and middle school and Redwood High School, where he played football, basketball, and lacrosse. As a senior, he recorded 42 receptions for 811 yards and earned first-team all-conference honors. He was lightly recruited by college football scouts, only receiving attention from FCS football programs including the University of San Diego and various Ivy League programs. However, he committed to Johns Hopkins University on a full lacrosse scholarship.

College career

Johns Hopkins University
Helfet accepted a full lacrosse scholarship to Johns Hopkins University, where he played lacrosse for the Blue Jays in the fall of 2007. After one semester at Johns Hopkins, Helfet transferred to Santa Rosa Junior College with hopes of pursuing a football career.

Santa Rosa Junior College
Helfet started his collegiate career at Santa Rosa Junior College in Santa Rosa, California. He was one of the very few junior college players ever to transfer to Duke University.

Duke University
In his junior year, which was his first season at Duke, he was named as an honorable mention All-ACC. In his senior season, he was among the players named to the 33-member watch list for the John Mackey Award. He was selected to the pre-season All-ACC by both Lindy's Sports second-team and Athlon Sports third-team also prior to his senior season.

Professional career

Seattle Seahawks
On May 16, 2012, he signed with the Seattle Seahawks as an undrafted free agent. On August 31, he was released. On January 17, 2013, he re-signed with the Seahawks to a futures contract. On August 31, 2013, he was released. On September 2, 2013, he was signed to the practice squad. On February 5, 2014, he was signed to a reserve/future contract. He would remain on the Seahawks for the 2015 season and part of the 2016 season.

Oakland Raiders
On October 11, 2016, Helfet was signed to the Oakland Raiders' practice squad. He signed a reserve/future contract with the Raiders on January 9, 2017. On July 25, 2017, the Raiders placed Helfet on the Non-Football Injury List.  He was released on September 2, 2017.

References

External links
 Seattle Seahawks bio

1989 births
Living people
American football tight ends
Duke Blue Devils football players
Oakland Raiders players
People from Kentfield, California
Seattle Seahawks players
Sportspeople from the San Francisco Bay Area
Redwood High School (Larkspur, California) alumni